Attila Mészáros (born 30 March 1981) is a Hungarian football goalkeeper.

References

1981 births
Living people
Hungarian footballers
Debreceni VSC players
MTK Budapest FC players
Százhalombattai LK footballers
Kecskeméti TE players
Hévíz FC footballers
Budapest Honvéd FC players
Lombard-Pápa TFC footballers
Nyíregyháza Spartacus FC players
Bőcs KSC footballers
Maidenhead United F.C. players
Nemzeti Bajnokság I players
Association football goalkeepers
Hungarian expatriate footballers
Expatriate footballers in England
Hungarian expatriate sportspeople in England
Sportspeople from Debrecen